The Mexican box turtle (Terrapene mexicana) is a species of box turtle belonging to the family Emydidae. It is sometimes treated as a subspecies of Terrapene carolina (Terrapene carolina mexicana).

Geographic range
This species is endemic to Mexico.  It is found in the Mexican states of Tamaulipas, Veracruz and San Luis Potosí.

Habitat
It lives in areas with tropical climates within humid forests at shallow rainwater puddles.

Description
The carapace is long and dome-shaped, with rather variable color and markings. The adult males show gray-blue nuances on the head and red or orange nuances on the front legs.

Biology
The Mexican box turtle does not have much information on them because very few of them are domesticated (kept as pets). However, we do know that they have a lifespan of 100 years. Usually these turtles have water nearby homes and a bush to hide. Having a home by the water will attract insects, which are a big part of their diet.

Gallery

Bibliography
Rhodin, Anders G.J.; van Dijk, Peter Paul; Inverson, John B.; Shaffer, H. Bradley; Roger, Bour (2011-12-31). "Turtles of the world, 2011 update: Annotated checklist of taxonomy, synonymy, distribution and conservation status". Chelonian Research Monographs. 5.
Fritz, Uwe; Havaš, Peter (2007). "Checklist of Chelonians of the World". Vertebrate Zoology. 57
Dodd, C. Kenneth. North American Box Turtles a Natural History. University of Oklahoma Press, 2002.
Milstead, William W., and Donald W. Tinkle. "Terrapene of Western Mexico, with Comments on the Species Groups in the Genus". Copeia, vol. 1967, no. 1, 1967, p. 180., 
Stone, Lynn M. Nature Watch: Box Turtles. Lynn M. Stone, 2007.

References

External links

 Box Turtles

Terrapene
Reptiles described in 1849
Taxa named by John Edward Gray